Ahmed Abdallah Abderemane (12 June 1919 – 26 November 1989) was a Comorian politician. He was a member of the French Senate from 1959 to 1973, and President of the Comoros from 25 October 1978 until his assassination in 1989.

Life prior to the presidency
Abdallah was born in Domoni, on the island of Anjouan. He began participating in the government in the 1940s, while the Comoros were still part of France. He was the President of the general council from 1949 until 1953, and was the chairman of the chamber of deputies during the 1970s.

First presidency

In 1972, Abdallah, now leader of his political party, the Comoros Democratic Union (UDC), became president of the government council and Chief Minister of the Comoros; he served in that position until 6 July 1975, when the islands became independent from France, (with the exception of Mayotte, which voted to remain part of France.) Abdallah became the first president of the independent islands, but was overthrown by Said Mohamed Jaffar in a coup d'état on August 3, 1975. Jaffar, in turn, would be overthrown by Ali Soilih in 1976.

Second presidency
Abdallah (who had been living in exile Paris, France) was the nominal leader of the coup staged by mercenary Bob Denard on 13 May 1978. After Said Atthoumani had served as "Chairman of the Politico-Military Directorate" for ten days, Abdallah and Mohamed Ahmed assumed the titles of "Co-Chairmen of the Politico-Military Directorate." On 22 July, their titles were changed to "Co-Chairmen of the Directorate," and on 3 October, Abdallah became the lone chair. Abdallah was in fact a puppet leader with no power to make decisions of his own, and the real ruler of the Comoros was Denard, who served as the commander of the Presidential Guard.

On 25 October, Abdallah assumed the title of president and remained in office until his death, despite three separate coup attempts against him. In 1982, Abdallah had the UDC and all other parties abolished, and a new party, the Comorian Union for Progress (UCP), was set up. The Comoros became a one-party state, with the UCP being the only legal party, the regime became dictatorial, supervised by mercenaries who controlled the country and avoided various coup attempts. Some opponents of the regime are executed or disappear during this period. The only candidate to be allowed to stand for election, Ahmed Abdallah was re-elected on September 30, 1984, and his party won all seats in the Federal Assembly on May 22, 1987. During this time, Denard proceeded to plunder the Comorian economy as he became the largest single landowner in the Comoros, taking over all the best land, which he then developed into luxury hotel resorts for wealthy Western tourists who wished to enjoy the tropics.

Assassination

On 26 November 1989, he was shot dead in his Moroni office on a highly disputed circumstances. It is generally believed that Denard had Abdallah assassinated for tying to dismiss him as commander of the Presidential Guard.  At his trial in 1999 for Abdallah's murder in Paris, Denard claimed that Abdallah was assassinated by  Abdallah Jaffar  during a coup led by Ali Soilih's half-brother, Said Mohamed Djohar. Denard was acquitted for a lack of evidence as the judge ruled that the prosecution made only a circumstantial case that Denard was behind Abdallah's murder.  Djohar took control of the country the next day. Denard tried to prevent Djohar from assuming the presidency, but this time, France, which found Denard an embarrassment, sent in military forces to gently usher Denard and his mercenaries out of the Comoros.

See also
List of heads of state of the Comoros

References

1919 births
1989 deaths
1989 murders in Africa
Leaders who took power by coup
Leaders ousted by a coup
Presidents of the Comoros
Foreign ministers of the Comoros
Assassinated heads of state
Assassinated Comorian politicians
People murdered in the Comoros
Deaths by firearm in the Comoros
People from Anjouan
Comorian Union for Progress politicians
French Senators of the Fifth Republic
Senators of French East Africa